Assembly of Pro-Democratic NGOs of Belarus (Assembly of NGOs) (Belarusian: Асамблея няўрадавых дэмакратычных арганізацыяў Беларусі (Асамблея НДА)) is an association of  non-governmental organizations and civil initiatives in Belarus that declare their commitment to promote principles of an independent, democratic and law-governed state. The Assembly of NGOs counts more than 300 member organizations and civil initiatives. It actively participates in the Eastern Partnership Civil Society Forum (EaP CSF), including its National Platform for Belarus. Since 2013, it has hosted annually the Civil Society Champions award ceremony to honor those prominent people or events in the civil sector.

References 

Organizations established in 1997
1997 establishments in Belarus
Civil affairs
Political advocacy groups in Belarus